William or Bill Sellars may refer to:

Bill Sellars (1925–2018), British television producer
Billy Sellars (1907–1987), English professional footballer

See also
William Sellers (disambiguation)
William Sellar (1866–1914), Scottish footballer